Olophrum is a genus of beetles belonging to the family Staphylinidae.

The species of this genus are found in Eurasia and Northern America.

Species:
 Olophrum aragatzense Iablokov-Khnzorian, 1962 
 Olophrum arcanum Scudder, 1900

References

Staphylinidae
Staphylinidae genera